"Facino Cane" is an 1836 short story by French author Honoré de Balzac (1799-1850) and included in the Scènes de la vie parisienne section of his novel sequence La Comédie humaine.  It first appeared in the Chronique de Paris on March 17, 1836 and in 1837 was classified by Balzac as a Philosophical Study (Étude philosophique).  In 1843, it appeared with Balzac's novel Albert Savarus.  In 1844, it became part of Balzac's La Comédie humaine.

Plot
Facino Cane is told in the first person by an unnamed narrator. It concerns a blind old man named Marco-Facino Cane, called "Father Canet", who claims to be a descendant of the 14th century condottiere of the same name. The narrator meets Facino Cane at the wedding celebration of his maid's sisters. His interest being piqued by the appearance of the old man, the narrator begins a conversation with him, and Facino Cane mentions being from Venice. When the narrator then mentions he would like to visit Venice, Facino Cane begs to be taken there. He then tells the story of his life and how he lost his status and money and became blind. The narrator promised to take Facino Cane with him to Venice some day, but the old man died that winter.

References

Books of La Comédie humaine
French short stories
Cane
Cane
Cane
Short stories by Honoré de Balzac
First-person narrative fiction